The 2020 Kafr Takharim airstrike occurred on 26 October 2020 when the Russian Air Force targeted a training camp run by Faylaq al-Sham, a major Islamist Syrian rebel group backed by Turkey, near the town of Kafr Takharim located around 10 kilometers from the Turkish border. At the time of the attack, the camp contained more than 180 rebels affiliated with Faylaq al-Sham. At least 78 rebel fighters were killed and over 100 more were wounded in the airstrike.

Attack 
According to the Syrian Observatory for Human Rights, the target site was a training camp that was bombed, while there were dozens of fighters who were being trained before they were transferred to Azerbaijan. Officially, the Russian Defense Ministry refused to comment on the incident.

The attack inflicted the highest number of casualties since the Russian-Turkish ceasefire that ended the Northwestern Syria offensive in March 2020. Director of the Syrian Observatory for Human Rights, Rami Abdel Rahman called it the fiercest attack against the Sham Legion since the Russian military intervention in September 2015.

Sources close to the Syrian government put the death toll of the strike at 200 dead and wounded within the ranks of Faylaq Al-Sham.

On 1 November 2020, the Syrian Observatory for Human Rights updated the number of casualties to 79 dead and dozens wounded.

According to Youssef Hammoud, a spokesman for the groups, leaders of the camp were among those killed in the airstrike.

Response 
Syrian rebel factions launched a massive artillery attack on Syrian Arab Army positions on 27 October 2020, killing 15 soldiers; one rebel was killed in the return bombardment. The following day, another Syrian soldier was killed as rebels continued shelling SAA positions in Idlib province.

Analysis 
According to international observers, the targeted Russian attack on the Sham Legion was a "message" to Turkey. Director of the U.S.-based Middle East Institute Charles Lister told Al Jazeera that as the militia group was Turkey’s closest proxy in Idlib province, this "wasn't a Russian attack on the Syrian opposition as much as it was a direct hit against – and message to – Turkey". He added that it was possible that wider geopolitics had pushed Russia to strike, referring to the deployment by Turkey of Syrian militants to Libya and to the area of the  Nagorno-Karabakh war.

Reactions 
On 27 October 2020, the U.S. special envoy for Syria James Jeffrey criticized the Russian attack and accused "the Assad regime and its Russian and Iranian allies of threatening the stability of the surrounding region, by continuing their quest for a military victory". He also stated "the attack was a dangerous escalation by the Assad government and apparent violation of the March 5 Idlib cease-fire agreement" and urged Assad and its allies to end their "needless, brutal war against the Syrian people".

The National Front for Liberation released a statement announcing the death of a "large number" of its fighters by Russian strikes and said it would not hesitate to retaliate. NLF spokesman Sayf Raad denounced the "Russian aircraft and regime forces continuously violating the Turkish-Russian deal in targeting military positions, villages and towns".

On 28 October 2020, in a parliamentary speech in Ankara, Turkish President Recep Tayyip Erdoğan condemned the attack on a site of the Turkish-backed Free Syrian Army, saying that Russia’s attack indicated its unwillingness to achieve a lasting peace in the region.

See also 
 2020 Balyun airstrikes

References 

Airstrikes during the Syrian civil war
Airstrikes conducted by Russia
2020 airstrikes
2020 in Syria
Military operations of the Syrian civil war in 2020
October 2020 events in Asia
Idlib Governorate in the Syrian civil war